Boniface Mwangi (born July 10, 1983) is a Kenyan photojournalist, politician and activist involved in social-political activism. He is known for his images of the post-election violence that hit Kenya in 2007 and 2008.

Early life 
Mwangi was born in Taveta, Kenya, on the border with Tanzania. His mother was a businesswoman who traded across the border. Mwangi started living with his grandparents in Nyeri, Central Kenya, when he was six.

He later moved in with his mother in Nairobi's low-income suburb of Ngara, then a high-rise in Majengo, Githurai 45, before finally settling in Pangani. Mwangi dropped in and out of school during this period and helped his mother vend books.

Journalism 
When his mother died in 2000, Mwangi, then 17, decided he had to change if he was to survive. He joined a Bible school with the intention of becoming a pastor, and secured a diploma in biblical studies. Whilst at school he became interested in photography. He was influenced by the Kenyan photographer Mohamed Amin.

Despite not having a high school education, Mwangi managed to gain a place at a private journalism school. To fund his studies he had to continue selling books on the street, but soon began to gain experience as a photojournalist. He published photographs in the national newspaper The Standard, and in 2005 won his first photography prizes. Within three years he received international recognition as one of Africa's most promising photographers. He was awarded the 2008 and 2010 CNN Africa Photojournalist of the Year Award.

However, he put his photography career on hold, to work on Kenyan social justice.

Activism 
Mwangi quit journalism after witnessing and documenting post-election violence in Kenya in 2007 as a newspaper photographer. He experienced posttraumatic stress and depression (and he was also directly affected having to move temporarily after people of his community were being threatened). More importantly, he was frustrated he had to cover the same politicians that had incited the violence but remained unpunished.

His first initiative was the project Picha Mtaani, Swahili for "photos in the street", showing photographs of the violence in 2007 after the national elections, between the different tribes. This traveling street exhibition was shown around the country for people to discuss reconciliation and promote national healing. Over 600,000 people saw the exhibition. This was later complemented by the documentary Heal the Nation, which was shown mostly in slum areas.

Following these initiatives Mwangi started to develop a stronger human rights stance in his work on fighting (political and corporate) impunity, speaking out against bad and corrupt political leadership, and promoting a message of peace for the elections planned for 2013 with initiatives called MaVulture and Team Courage. Team Courage is a Nairobi-based lobby that strives to enable a patriotic citizens' movement to take bold and effective actions in building a new Kenya.

His latest initiative is Pawa 254 which was launched in 2011, a hub and space for artists and activists to work together towards social change and advancing Human rights in Kenya.

Controversy

Arrest on suspicion of organizing a revolution
Mwangi was arrested by police in May 2019 for allegedly organizing a revolution in Kenya.

Fabricating allegations and witness coaching
In October 2016, Mwangi linked William Ruto to the assassination of a murdered Jubilee government critic Jacob Juma and that Ruto also wanted him dead as well. In the same month Ruto sued Mwangi for defamation. In December 2016, Mwangi was accused of fabricating allegations against Ruto including coaching a witness to lie about allegations about Juma's murder, in court and to the Kenyan media. In the same month it was reported by Daily Nation that a person from Ruto's office delivered a letter to Mwangi to help him with his defamation case. That person later recanted his statements and claimed Mwangi coached him to fabricate stories about his claims on Juma's murder yet Mwangi had nothing provable about any of his claims but had just concocted non-existent and non-provable allegations about the murder.

Politics
He formed Ukweli Party and was a candidate for the Starehe Constituency member of Parliament seat in the 2017 Kenyan general election.

Personal life 
He is married to Hellen Njeri Mwangi, whom he works with at Pawa 254. They have three children.

Honours and awards 
 Time: Next Generation Leaders 2015
Mwangi was cited as one of the Top 100 most influential Africans by New African magazine in 2020.

References

External links 

 

1983 births
Living people
Kenyan photographers
Kenyan activists
Photojournalists